Piotr Woźniak may refer to:
 Piotr Woźniak (politician), Polish politician
 Piotr Woźniak (researcher), Polish programmer and researcher into memory and learning